Caroline Frances Meyer  (née Evers-Swindell, born 10 October 1978),  is a New Zealand former rower. She competed in the double sculls with her identical twin sister Georgina Evers-Swindell. In November 2005 she and her sister were named Rowing Female Crew of the Year by the International Rowing Federation (FISA),  and in 2016 they became the first New Zealanders to be awarded the federation's highest award, the Thomas Keller Medal.

Early life
She was born in Hastings, New Zealand, on 10 October 1978.

Career
The twins narrowly missed the qualification for the 2000 Summer Olympics in Sydney; in the crucial race in Lucerne where they had to come second, they came third. In 2001, she won silver at the World Championships in both the double and quadruple sculls. Together with her sister she won gold at both the 2002 and 2003 World Rowing Championships in the double sculls. She also won, again with her sister, the 2004 Olympic gold medal. Caroline was coached by Dick Tonks and represented Hamilton Rowing Club.

In the 2005 New Year Honours, she was made an Officer of the New Zealand Order of Merit, for services to rowing.

At the 2008 Summer Olympics in Beijing, she and her sister won gold medals in the women's double sculls, beating the German double by 1/100 of a second, 7:07.32 versus 7:07.33. This was the first time in history that the women's double scull title had successfully been defended. She and her sister announced their retirement from rowing in October 2008.

In December 2008, she and her sister won the Lonsdale Cup which is awarded by the New Zealand Olympic Committee to the athlete/s who make the most outstanding contribution to an Olympic sport. They previously won the cup in 2003.

Personal life
In December 2009, Evers-Swindell married former Olympic rower Carl Meyer. She now styles herself Caroline Meyer.

References

Sources

|-

1978 births
Living people
New Zealand female rowers
New Zealand twins
Rowers at the 2004 Summer Olympics
Rowers at the 2008 Summer Olympics
Olympic gold medalists for New Zealand in rowing
Waldorf school alumni
Sportspeople from Hastings, New Zealand
Twin sportspeople
Officers of the New Zealand Order of Merit
Medalists at the 2008 Summer Olympics
Medalists at the 2004 Summer Olympics
World Rowing Championships medalists for New Zealand
Thomas Keller Medal recipients